Harkin is an Irish surname, from the Gaelic Ó hEarcáin. It may refer to:

 Allana Harkin, Canadian comedian and playwright
 Bryan Harkin (born 1980), Northern Irish footballer
 Fergal Harkin (born 1976), Irish footballer
 James B. Harkin (1875–1955), Canadian commissioner for national parks
 Janet Quin-Harkin, author
 Marian Harkin (born 1953), Irish politician
 Michael E. Harkin (born 1958), U.S. anthropologist
 Mikko Härkin (born 1979), Finnish musician
 Mo Harkin (born 1979), footballer
 Ruairí Harkin (born 1989), footballer
 Ruth Harkin (born 1944), U.S. lawyer; wife of Tom Harkin
 Terry Harkin (born 1941), Northern Irish footballer
 Tom Harkin (born 1939), United States Senator from Iowa
 William Harkin (1831–1881), Canadian doctor and politician

See also
 Harkin Bay, Nunavut, Canada
 Harkin-Engel Protocol—international agreement aimed at ending the worst forms of child labor in cocoa production
 Harkin's General Store
 Harkins
 Oddo-Harkins rule